Godfrey Phillips may refer to:

G. Godfrey Phillips (1900-1965), Commissioner General of the Shanghai Municipal Council
Godfrey Phillips India, tobacco company